The Makarora River is in the Otago region of the South Island of New Zealand.

Name
The Kai Tahu name for the river is Makarore.

 ( in the Kāi Tahu dialect) means stream.

Geography
The headwaters are in Mount Aspiring National Park, on the eastern flanks of the Southern Alps near Haast Pass, which is the saddle between the Makarora and Haast River valleys. The Makarora River flows south into the northern end of Lake Wānaka after passing the small community of Makarora.  The river attracts some recreational fishing, jetboating and kayaking. Rainbow and brown trout migrate from Lake Wānaka up the river and its tributaries to spawn, mainly in autumn and winter.

Landslide
In September 2007 a landslide in the Young River valley blocked off the corresponding stream. Young River is a tributary to Makarora River. The landslide created a new lake. The lake appears to be permanent.

Tourism 
 follows the Makarora River for the majority of its course from just south of Haast Pass.  A popular short walk leads to its confluence with the Blue River, at the aptly named Blue Pools. Cameron Flat Campground is a convenient campsite with a cooking shelter and bathrooms directly off State Highway 6.

See also
List of rivers of New Zealand

References

External links

 https://web.archive.org/web/20100105121020/http://www.geonet.org.nz/landslide/young-river-landslide/index.html
 https://web.archive.org/web/20100522172420/http://www.geonet.org.nz/docs/landslide/reports/Young-River-poster-A3.pdf

Rivers of Otago
Mount Aspiring National Park
Landslide-dammed lakes
Rivers of New Zealand
Tributaries of the Clutha River